Feldkirchen-Ossiacher See Airport is a private use airport located near Feldkirchen, Kärnten, Austria.

See also
Austria Grand Prix Gliding
List of airports in Austria

References

External links 
 Airport record for Feldkirchen-Ossiacher See Airport at Landings.com

Airports in Austria
Carinthia (state)